Adrian Ignacio Carambula Raurich (born 16 March 1988) is a Uruguay-born Italian beach volleyball player.

Born in Uruguay, he played football alongside Luis Suárez as a boy, until his family moved to Florida when he was a teenager. He qualifies to represent Italy through his maternal grandmother, originally from Turin.

He is known as "Mr Skyball" for his unique serving style, in which he hits the ball high. The theme from the James Bond film Skyfall plays when he serves.

Ranked third in the world as a pair, Carambula partnered Alex Ranghieri at the 2016 Olympics.

Since 2018, Carambula plays together with Enrico Rossi.

References

External links
 
 
 
 

1988 births
Living people
Italian people of Uruguayan descent
Uruguayan emigrants to the United States
Italian beach volleyball players
Beach volleyball players at the 2016 Summer Olympics
Italian
Beach volleyball players at the 2020 Summer Olympics